The Texas A&M Health Science Center (officially known as Texas A&M Health), a component of Texas A&M University, offers health professions research, education and patient care in dentistry, medicine, nursing, biomedical sciences, public health, and pharmacy. It was established in 1999 as an independent institution of the Texas A&M University System and received accreditation in December 2002 from the Southern Association of Colleges and Schools to award baccalaureate, master's, doctoral and professional degrees. The institution merged with Texas A&M University proper on July 12, 2013.

Other components include the Institute of Biosciences and Technology in Houston and the Coastal Bend Health Education Center in Corpus Christi.

Texas A&M Health offers a variety of bachelor, master, and doctoral degrees in a range of topic areas including dentistry, public health, biomedical sciences, pharmacy and nursing.

Degrees offered

Texas A&M University School of Dentistry 

 Bachelor of Science (BS), Dental Hygiene 
 Master of Science (MS), Oral Biology 
 Doctor of Philosophy (PhD), Oral Biology 
 Doctor of Dental Surgery (DDS)

Texas A&M University School of Medicine 

 Doctor of Medicine (MD) (Bryan-College Station, Dallas, Houston, Round Rock, Temple)
 Medical Science (PhD) (Bryan-College Station, Houston)
 Medical Science (MS) (Bryan-College Station)
 Education for Healthcare Professionals (MS) (Online)
 Education for Healthcare Professionals certificate (Online)
 Doctor of Medicine/Doctorate of Philosophy (MD/PhD) (Bryan-College Station, Houston)
 MD + Business Administration (MD+MBA) (Bryan-College Station)
 MD + Master of Public Health (MD+MPH) (Bryan-College Station)
MD + Master of Science (MD+MS) (Bryan-College Station, Houston)
 MD + Master of Science in Education for Healthcare Professionals (MD+EDHP) degree (Online)
 MD + Science and Technology Journalism (MD+STJR) (Bryan-College Station)
 Engineering Medicine (MD+ME) (Houston)

Texas A&M University School of Nursing 

 Traditional (BSN)
 Second Degree (BSN)
 RN to BSN
 Nursing Education (MSN)
 Family Nurse Practitioner (MSN)
 Forensic Nursing (MSN)
 Doctor of Nursing Practice (DNP)
 Graduate Certificate in Forensic Health Care

Texas A&M University Irma Lerma Rangel School of Pharmacy 

 Doctor of Pharmacy (PharmD)
 Pharmacy + Business Administration (PharmD + MBA)
 Doctor of Philosophy in Pharmaceutical Sciences (PhD)

Texas A&M University School of Public Health 

 Bachelor of Science in Public Health (BSPH) degree (Bryan-College Station, McAllen)
 Minor in Public Health
 Minor in Occupational Safety and Health
 Master of Public Health (MPH) (Bryan-College Station, McAllen, Online)
 Master of Health Administration Resident Track (MHA) (Bryan-College Station)
 Master of Health Administration Executive Track (MHA) (Houston)
 Doctor of Public Health (DrPH) (Bryan-College Station)
 Doctor of Philosophy in Health Services Research (PhD) (Bryan-College Station)
 Undergraduate dual degree programs
 Bachelor of Science and Master of Public Health (BS/MPH) (Bryan-College Station)
 Bachelor of Science Interdisciplinary Engineering and Master of Public Health in Occupational Safety (Bryan-College Station)
 Bachelor of Science Industrial Engineering and Master of Public Health in Occupational Safety (Bryan-College Station)
 Graduate dual degree programs
 Master of International Affairs/Master of Public Health (MIA/MPH) (Bryan-College Station)
 Doctor of Medicine/Master of Public Health (MD+MPH) (Bryan-College Station)
 Juris Doctor/Master of Public Health in Health Policy and Management (JD/MPH) (Bryan-College Station)
 Global Health Certificate (Bryan-College Station)
 Maternal and Child Health Certificate (Bryan-College Station)
 Health Systems Management Certificate (Bryan-College Station)

References

Texas A&M University colleges and schools
Bryan, Texas